Azalapur is a panchayat village in the south Indian state of Karnataka. Administratively, Azalapur is under Gurumitkal Taluka of Yadgir District.

Geography 
The village is 3.5km by road northwest of the village of Ujjelli in Telangana, and 20km by road east of the town of Saidapur in Yadgir Taluka.  The nearest railhead is in Yadgir. Two lakes are located there.

Government 
Azalapur village is administrated by an elected sarpanch.

Demographics 
According to a 2011 census Azalapur has a population of 2,254 of whom 1,098 are male and 1,156 female.

Education 
Azalapur has a government higher primary school that teaches in Kannada and Urdu, and two government high schools offered in Kannada. It has three anganwadi.

Medical facilities 
Azalapur has a government primary health centre.

Scenic places 
The Old Hanuman temple is located nearby.

Festivals 

Festivals include Dussehra.

Notes

External links 
 

Villages in Yadgir district